Miranda may refer to:

Law
 Miranda v. Arizona, an American legal case
 Miranda warning, an American police warning given to suspects about their rights, before they are interrogated

Places

Australia
 Miranda, New South Wales
 Miranda railway station, New South Wales

Portugal
 Miranda do Corvo, a município in Coimbra District, Centro
 Miranda do Douro (parish), a freguesia in Bragança District, Norte
 Miranda do Douro, a município in Bragança District, Norte
 Terra de Miranda, a plateau in Bragança District, Norte

Spain
 Miranda (Avilés), a parish of Avilés, Asturias
 Belmonte de Miranda, Asturias
 Miranda de Arga, Navarre
 Miranda de Ebro, Castile and Leon
 , in Los Rábanos, in the Province of Soria, Castile and Leon
 Miranda del Castañar, in the Province of Salamanca, Castile and Leon

United States
 Miranda, California
 Miranda, South Dakota

Venezuela
 Miranda (state)
 Francisco de Miranda Municipality, Anzoátegui
 Francisco de Miranda, in Guárico
 Francisco de Miranda, in Táchira
 Miranda, Carabobo
 Miranda Municipality, Falcón
 Miranda Municipality, Mérida
 Miranda, in Trujillo
 Miranda, in Zulia

Other places
Château Miranda, a former castle in Belgium
 Miranda, Mato Grosso do Sul, Brazil
 Miranda, Cauca, Colombia
 Güinía de Miranda, Cuba
 Miranda, Molise, Italy
 Miranda, New Zealand
 Plaza Miranda, Philippines

Solar system
 Miranda (moon), a moon orbiting Uranus

Arts and entertainment

Films and television
 Miranda (1948 film), a film about a mermaid by English director Ken Annakin
 Miranda (1985 film), a film by Italian director Tinto Brass
 Miranda (2002 film), a film by British director Marc Munden
 Miranda (TV series), a British television series
 Miranda, a country in the French film The Discreet Charm of the Bourgeoisie
 Miranda Sings, a television and social media comedy character portrayed by American comedian Colleen Ballinger

Literature
 Miranda (The Tempest), a character from the Shakespeare play The Tempest
 Miranda (novel), a novel by Polish writer Antoni Lange

Music
 "Miranda", a song by Phil Ochs on his 1967 album Pleasures of the Harbor
 Miranda!, an Argentine electropop band
 Miranda (group), a French Eurodance group with the frontwoman Sandra Miranda García
 Miranda (Colombian singer), Colombian singer, winner of La Voz Colombia
 Miranda (album), an album by Icelandic band Tappi Tíkarrass

Organisations
 Miranda Camera Company, a Japanese camera manufacturer
 Miranda House, Delhi, a college for women at the University of Delhi, India
 Miranda Naturalists' Trust, a New Zealand conservation organisation

Technology
 Miranda (programming language), a computer programming language
 Miranda (satellite), a British satellite in low earth orbit
 VRSS-1, second Venezuelan satellite in low earth orbit, named after Francisco de Miranda
 Miranda NG, a computer software instant messaging client based on Miranda IM

People
 Miranda (given name), includes list of real and fictional people with given name Miranda
 Miranda (surname), includes list of people with surname Miranda
 Miranda (footballer, born 1984), Brazilian footballer, at São Paulo, played for Brazil national team
 Miranda (footballer, born 1998), Brazilian footballer, at Covilhã
 Miranda (footballer, born 2000), Brazilian footballer, at Vasco da Gama
 Miranda Hart (born 1972), English comedian and actress, sometimes mononymously referred to as Miranda

Other uses
 Miranda station (Caracas), a station of on the Los Teques Metro line of the Caracas Metro in Venezuela
 Miranda station (Valencia), a metro station in Valencia
 Miranda (ship), two merchant ships
 HMS Miranda, three ships of the British Royal Navy

See also
 Miranda herba, a historic term for the carnivorous plant Nepenthes distillatoria
 Miranda cophinaria, an alternative name for spider Argiope aurantia
 Miranda II, a fictional spaceship in the Japanese television series Transformers: Energon
 Mirinda, a brand of soft drink